The following is a list of chief executive officers of notable companies. The list also includes lead executives with a position corresponding to chief executive officer (CEO), such as managing director (MD), and any concurrent positions held.

List of CEOs

See also 
 Chief executive officer

References 

Lists of businesspeople
Corporation-related lists
 chief executive officers